Ronald Charles "Owl" Northcott,  (born December 31, 1935 in Innisfail, Alberta) is a three-time Canadian and World curling champion and a Hall of Fame member.

Northcott began curling as a high school student at age fifteen. His talents saw him eventually represent the province of Alberta at six Canadian Championships. He skipped his team to the Canadian and World Curling Championships in 1966, 1968, and 1969.

Ron Northcott was inducted into Canada's Sports Hall of Fame in 1970 and on its formation in 1973, into the Canadian Curling Hall of Fame. He was also inducted into the WCF Hall of Fame in 2013. In 1976, he was made a Member of the Order of Canada.

In addition to curling, Northcott was also a race horse owner. At the time of the 1966 Brier, he was an executive with Canadian Mannix Corporation in Calgary.

References

External links
 

Members of the Order of Canada
Curlers from Alberta
1935 births
Living people
World curling champions
Brier champions
People from Red Deer County
Canadian male curlers
Canadian racehorse owners and breeders
20th-century Canadian people